Throughout its history, the National Football League (NFL) and other rival American football leagues have used several different formats to determine their league champions, including a period of inter-league matchups to determine a true national champion.

Following its founding in 1920, the NFL first determined champions through end-of-season standings, switching to a playoff system in 1933 (a one-game playoff was required in 1932). 

The rival All-America Football Conference (AAFC) and American Football League (AFL) have since merged with the NFL (the only two AAFC teams that currently exist, the Cleveland Browns and the San Francisco 49ers, joined the NFL in ), but AAFC Championship Games and records are not included in the NFL's record books. The AFL began play in 1960 and, like its rival league, used a playoff system to determine its champion.

Following the merger in 1970, the Super Bowl name continued as the game to determine the NFL champion. The former NFL Championship Game became the NFC Championship Game, while the former AFL Championship Game became the AFC Championship Game. The NFL lists the old AFL/NFL championship games with "new" AFC/NFC championship games in its record books.  

The Green Bay Packers have won the most NFL championship titles with 13 (9 pre-Super Bowl era NFL championships and 4 Super Bowls, including the first two AFL-NFL World Championship Games). The Chicago Bears have won the second most overall championships with 9 (8 pre-Super Bowl era NFL championships and one Super Bowl). The New York Jets and the Kansas City Chiefs of the AFL won the last two AFL-NFL World Championship Games, after the Super Bowl name had been officially adopted.

1920–1932: The early years

This sometimes led to very unusual results, as teams played anywhere from six to twenty league games in a season, and not all teams played the same number of games or against league talent.

As a result, in the league's first six seasons, four league titles were disputed and had to be resolved by the league's executive committee. In 1920, the Akron Pros went undefeated, tying three games, but two teams that had won more games (and who had both tied Akron), the Buffalo All-Americans and Decatur Staleys, petitioned the league for a share of the title; both teams' petitions were denied, and Akron was awarded the first (and only) Brunswick-Balke Collender Cup. According to modern tie-breaking rules, Akron and Buffalo would be co-champions.  Akron and Buffalo both awarded their team members with gold medallions. 

The next was in the 1921 NFL season, between the same All-Americans and Staleys (with the latter now being based in Chicago). Buffalo had insisted that the last matchup between the two was an exhibition game not to be counted toward the standings, however, Chicago owner George Halas and league management insisted the game be counted in its standings (the league, at the time, did not recognize exhibition matches). The result was that although the two teams were effectively tied in the standings, the disputed game, having been played later, was given more weight and thus ended up being considered a de facto championship game. Chicago also had one fewer tie game. 

A nearly identical situation recurred in 1924, when Chicago tried the same tactic of a final game against the Cleveland Bulldogs, but the league ruled the opposite and declared the last game "post-season", giving the Bulldogs their third consecutive league title.

The fourth and final disputed title was the 1925 NFL Championship controversy between the Pottsville Maroons and the Chicago Cardinals. The Maroons had been controversially suspended by the league at the end of the 1925 NFL season for an unauthorized game against a non-NFL team, allowing the Cardinals to throw together two fairly easy matches (one against a team consisting partly of high school players, also against league rules) to pass Pottsville in the standings. The league awarded the Cardinals the title, one of only two in the team's history, but the Cardinals declined the offer and the championship was vacated.

Only in 1933, when the Bidwill family (which still owns the Cardinals) bought the team, did the Cardinals reverse their decision and claim the title as their own, a decision that continues to be disputed, with the Bidwills opposing any change in the record and the two current Pennsylvania teams in favor. The league recognized the Bidwills' claim to the title and has taken no other action on the issue, although a self-made championship trophy from the Maroons sits in the Pro Football Hall of Fame.  Ironically, it was Pottsville's win in that game against the Notre Dame All-Stars that gave professional football legitimacy over college football.

Part of the controversy over these older championships stems from the criteria the league used to determine its champion. The league used a variation of win percentage as its criterion, in which the number of wins is divided by the sum of wins and losses, and ties were excluded. The league began considering ties in its standings in 1972, counting them as half a win and half a loss, but this was not applied retroactively. Had it been, it would have changed the outcome of four 1920-1931 championships: the Buffalo All-Americans would have tied the Akron Pros for the 1920 title, the Duluth Kelleys would have tied the Cleveland Bulldogs for the 1924 title, the Pottsville Maroons would have won in 1925, and the New York Giants would have won in 1930.

Had win–loss differential (the standard method in baseball) been used, the Decatur Staleys would have won the 1920 title by virtue of being one game ahead of Buffalo, and the 1924 title would have been won by the Frankford Yellow Jackets, who were four games ahead of actual champion Cleveland in the standings by that measure.

At the end of the  season, the Chicago Bears and the Portsmouth Spartans were tied with the best winning percentage at .857, with the Spartans record of 6–1–4 and the Bears record of 6–1–6 taken to be six wins, one loss, while the Green Bay Packers finished 10–3–1. 
Had pure win–loss differential or the current (post-1972) system of counting ties as half a win, half a loss been in place in 1932, the Packers' record of 10–3–1 (.750, +7) would have won them a fourth consecutive championship, ahead of the Spartans' 6–1–4 (.727, +5) and the Bears' 6–1–6 (.692, +5).

To determine the champion, the league, reportedly at the behest of George Preston Marshall, voted to hold the first official playoff game in Chicago at Wrigley Field.  Because of severe winter conditions before the game, and fear of low turnout, the game was held indoors at Chicago Stadium which forced some temporary rule changes. The game was played on a modified 80-yard dirt field, and Chicago won 9–0, winning the league championship.  Since the game counted in the standings, Portsmouth finished third behind Green Bay.

A number of new rule changes were instituted, many inspired by the 1932 indoor championship game: the goal posts were moved forward to the goal line, every play started from between the hash marks, and forward passes could originate from anywhere behind the line of scrimmage (instead of five yards behind).

The playoff game proved so popular that the league reorganized into two divisions for the  season, with the winners advancing to a scheduled championship game.

1933–1965: The advent of the postseason

1933–1965: NFL Championship Game

During this period, the league divided its teams into two groups, through  as divisions and from 1950 onward as conferences.

 Divisions (1933–1949): Eastern and Western
 Conferences (1950–1952): American and National
 Conferences (1953–1966): Eastern and Western
 Conferences and Divisions (1967–1969): Eastern (Capitol and Century) and Western (Central and Coastal)

Home field for the 1933 title game was determined by the won-lost percentage in use at the time; the Western Division champion Chicago Bears (10–2–1), having a better record than the Eastern Division champion New York Giants (11–3–0), won the right to host the first title playoff. Thereafter, from 1934 onward, the divisions alternated the site of the playoff, with the East/American hosting in even years and the West/National in odd years.  If there was a tie for first place within the conference, an extra playoff game decided who would go to the NFL Championship Game, with a coin toss deciding where the game would be played.  (This occurred nine times in these 34 seasons: 1941, 1943, 1947, 1950 (both conferences), 1952, 1957, 1958, and 1965.)

This last occurred during the 1965 season, when the Green Bay Packers and Baltimore Colts tied for first place in the Western Conference at 10–3–1. Green Bay had won both its games with Baltimore during the regular season, but because no tie-breaker system was in place, a conference playoff game was held on December 26 (what was scheduled to be an off-week between the end of the regular schedule and the NFL Championship Game).  The Cleveland Browns, the Eastern champion at 11–3–0, did not play that week.  The championship game was then held on its originally scheduled date, January 2, 1966—the first time the NFL champion was crowned in January. Green Bay won both post-season games at home, beating the injury-riddled Colts (with third-string QB Tom Matte) in overtime by a controversial field goal, and taking the title 23–12 on a very muddy field (in what turned out to be Jim Brown's final NFL game).

For the 1960 through 1969 seasons, the NFL staged an additional postseason game called the "Playoff Bowl" (aka the "Bert Bell Benefit Bowl" or the "Runner-up Bowl"). These games matched the second-place teams from the two conferences; the CBS television network advertised them as "playoff games for third place in the NFL." All ten of these consolation games were played in the Orange Bowl in Miami in January, the week after the NFL championship game. The NFL now classifies these contests as exhibition games and does not include the records, participants, or results in the official league playoff statistics.  The Playoff Bowl was discontinued after the AFL–NFL merger; the final edition was played in January 1970.

Starting with the 1934 game the winning team received the Ed Thorp Memorial Trophy. The trophy was named after Ed Thorp, a noted referee, rules expert, and sporting goods dealer. Thorp died in 1934 and a large, traveling trophy was made that year, passed along from champion to champion each season with each championship team's name inscribed on it. Teams would also receive a replica trophy. The trophy was last awarded to the Minnesota Vikings in 1969.

Late in the 1940 season, NFL President Carl Storck announced that sudden death periods would be authorized for any playoff game needed to decide either division title.  It was emphasized that this did not apply to the final championship game, which would crown co-champions in the event of a tie.  While a shared championship was deemed an acceptable solution, it must have become obvious that an elimination game leading to the championship must necessarily produce a winner.  Commissioner Elmer Layden approved a similar arrangement for the 1941 season, with the same limitation.  A coin toss would decide possession of the Ed Thorp trophy that accompanied the league title should the championship game result in a tie.

Sudden death overtime was finally approved for the NFL championship game in 1946 and has remained in effect ever since.  The first playoff game requiring overtime was the 1958 NFL Championship Game.

The 1955 and 1960 NFL championship games were played on Monday afternoons, Christmas having fallen on a Sunday in those years.

1946–1949: AAFC Championship Game

The All-America Football Conference was created in June 1944 to compete against the NFL. Even though the league outdrew the NFL in attendance, the continuing dominance of the Cleveland Browns led to the league's downfall.
	 
For its first three seasons, the league was divided into two divisions: Eastern and Western (1946–1948). The league had no divisions in 1949. The site of the championship game during the first three was determined just as it was in the NFL—a divisional rotation. In 1949, the league held a four-team playoff, with home field based upon won-lost record.
	 
The Browns, led by Quarterback Otto Graham, won all four of the league championship games.
	 
A tiebreaker playoff game was played in 1948 to break a tie between the Baltimore Colts and Buffalo Bills (AAFC) for the Eastern Division championship. Semifinal playoff games were held in 1949, setting up a championship final between the first-place Browns and the second-place San Francisco 49ers.
	 
In 1948, the Browns became the first professional football team to complete an entire season undefeated and untied — 24 years before the 1972 Miami Dolphins of the NFL would accomplish the task, but this feat is not recognized by NFL record books. Unlike the AFL statistics which are treated as NFL statistics, records of the AAFC and its teams (most of which folded) are not recognized. However, individual AAFC player statistics are included in Pro Football Hall of Fame records, and the defunct conference is memorialized in the Hall.

1960–1969: AFL Championship Game

With its creation in 1960, the AFL determined its champion via a single playoff game between the winners of its two divisions, the Eastern and Western.  The AFL Championship games featured classics such as the 1962 double-overtime championship game between the Dallas Texans and the defending champion Houston Oilers. At the time it was the longest professional football championship game ever played.  Also in 1963, an Eastern Division playoff was needed to determine the division winner between the Boston Patriots and Buffalo Bills.

1966–1969: NFL vs. AFL—The beginning of the Super Bowl era

In 1966, the success of the rival AFL, the spectre of the NFL's losing more stars to the AFL, and concern over a costly "bidding war" for players precipitated by the NFL's Giants' signing of Pete Gogolak, who was under contract to the AFL's Buffalo Bills, led the two leagues to discuss a merger. Pivotal to this was approval by Congress of a law (PL 89-800) that would waive jeopardy to anti-trust statutes for the merged leagues. The major point of the testimony given by the leagues to obtain the law was that if the merger were permitted, "Professional football operations will be preserved in the 23 cities and 25 stadiums where such operations are presently being conducted." The merger was announced on June 8, 1966, and became fully effective in 1970.

The playoff format was expanded from a single championship game to a four-team tournament, with the four divisional champions participating. The two division winners in each conference met in the "Conference Championships", with the winners advancing to the NFL Championship Game. Again, the home team for each playoff game was determined by a yearly divisional or conference rotation.

The AFL, on the other hand, raised its total franchise number to ten with the Miami Dolphins joining the Eastern Division in 1966 and the Cincinnati Bengals joining the Western Division in 1968.  The league until 1969 kept using the one-game-playoff format except when division tie-breakers were needed. In its final season, 1969, the AFL adopted a four-team playoff to determine its champion.

Following the NFL and AFL Championship Games for the  through  seasons, the NFL champion played the AFL champion in Super Bowls I through IV, the only true inter-league championship games in the history of professional football. The first two of these games were known as the AFL-NFL Championship Game, as the title Super Bowl was not chosen until 1968. Thus the third AFL-NFL matchup was dubbed "Super Bowl III" and the first two matches were retronamed as Super Bowls I and II. The first two games were convincingly won by the NFL's Packers, the last two by the AFL's New York Jets and Kansas City Chiefs, leaving the leagues even at 2–2 in "Championship" competition when they subsequently merged.

All participants in those four AFL-NFL championship games were either AFL champions or NFL champions in the record books, no matter the outcome of the Super Bowl. Three of the four league champions who lost one of the first four Super Bowls would eventually win at least one. The exception is the Minnesota Vikings which went to three others and lost all of them.

1970–present: The Super Bowl era

Post–merger
After the  season and Super Bowl IV, the AFL and NFL fully merged and underwent a re-alignment for the  season. Three of the pre-merger NFL teams were transferred to the AFC (Browns, Colts, and Steelers) to level the conferences (AFC and NFC) at 13 teams each; each conference split into three divisions.

With only six division winners in the newly merged league, the NFL designed an eight-team playoff tournament, with four clubs from each conference qualifying.  Along with the three division winners in each conference, two wild card teams (one from each conference), the second-place finishers with the best records in each conference, were added to the tournament.  The first round was named the "Divisional Playoffs", the winners advancing to the "Conference Championships" (AFC & NFC).  Two weeks later, the AFC and NFC champions met in the Super Bowl, now the league's championship game.  Thus, Super Bowl V in January 1971 was the first Super Bowl played for the NFL title.

With the introduction of the wild card, a rule was instituted to prohibit two teams from the same division (champion and wild card) from meeting in the first-round (Divisional Playoffs). This rule would remain in effect through the  season. More significantly, the home teams in the playoffs were still decided by a yearly divisional rotation, not on regular-season records (excluding the wild-card teams, who would always play on the road). This lack of "home-field advantage" was most evident in the 1972 playoffs, when the undefeated Miami Dolphins played the AFC Championship Game at Three Rivers Stadium in Pittsburgh against the Steelers, who were undefeated at home during the regular season, but had three losses on the road.

Each tie was then counted as half of a win and half of a loss, rather than being omitted from the computation. Previously, the NFL disregarded any tie games played when they computed the standings, basing it on winning percentage with any ties thrown out and ignored. Overtime games were not played during the regular season until .

The institution of "home-field advantage"
In , the league modified its 1970 playoff format by instituting a seeding system. The surviving clubs with the higher seeds were made the home teams for each playoff round. The three division champions in each conference were seeded first through third based on their regular-season records, with the wild-card team in each conference as the fourth seed.

Teams that earned the top seed became known as clinching "home-field advantage" throughout the playoffs, since they played all of their playoff games at their home stadium (except for the Super Bowl, played at a neutral site).

However, the league continued to prohibit meetings between teams from the same division in the Divisional Playoffs.  Thus, there would be times when the pairing in that round would pit the first seed versus the third, and the second versus the fourth.

Further playoff expansion
The two wild-card teams from each conference (the fourth and fifth seeds) played each other in the first round, called the "Wild Card Playoffs." The division winners (the first three seeds) would then receive a bye to automatically advance to the Divisional Playoffs, which became the second round of the playoffs. In the divisional round, much like the  playoff format, teams from the same division were still prohibited from playing each other, regardless of seeding. Under the  format, teams from the same division could meet only in the wild-card round or the conference championship. Thus, as before, a divisional champion could only play a divisional foe in the conference championship game.

A players' strike shortened the 1982 season to nine games.  The league used a special 16-team playoff tournament for that year.  The top eight teams from each conference qualified (ignoring the divisional races—there were no division standings, and in some cases, two teams from the same division did not play each other at all that season).  The playoffs reverted to the 1978 format in the following year.

In , the NFL expanded the playoffs to twelve teams by adding a third wild-card team (a sixth seed) from each conference.  The restrictions on intra-division playoff games during the Divisional Playoffs were removed.  However, only the top two division winners in each conference (the 1 and 2 seeds) received byes and automatically advanced to the Divisional Playoffs as host teams.  The 3 seed, the division winner with the worst regular-season record in each conference, would then host the 6 seed in the Wild Card Playoffs.

In , the NFL realigned into eight divisions, four per conference, to accommodate a 32nd team, the Houston Texans.  The playoffs remained a 12-team tournament, with four division winners (the 1, 2, 3, and 4 seeds) and two wild cards (the 5 and 6 seeds) from each conference advancing to the playoffs. Again, only the top two division winners in each conference would automatically advance to the Divisional Playoffs, while everybody else had to play in the Wild Card round. Furthermore, the league still maintains the names "Wild Card Playoffs", "Divisional Playoffs", and "Conference Championships" for the first, second, and third rounds of the playoffs, respectively.

A proposal to expand the playoffs to 14 teams by adding a third wild card team (a seventh seed) from each conference, and only giving the 1 seeds the bye in the first round, was tabled by the league owners in 2013. Finally, for the  season, seven teams per conference made the playoffs, with only the top seed in each conference receiving a bye.

Championship games per season
Below is a list of professional football champions per season as recognized by the Pro Football Hall of Fame.

APFA/NFL standings champions (1920–1932)

Played indoors on a reduced-size field in order to break a tie in the standings, it was the precursor to the championship game (though the losing team finished in third place in the final standings). For the seasons from –, the NFL did not include tie games in the winning percentage; they were omitted from the calculation.

NFL Championship Game (1933–1965)

Super Bowl championship (1966–present)

NFL championships by franchise
In the sortable table below, teams are ordered first by number of wins, then by number of appearances, then by year of first championship won, and finally by year of first appearance. Does not include the AFL or NFL championships won during the same seasons as the AFL–NFL Super Bowl championships before the 1970 AFL–NFL merger. Does not include AFL titles won from 1960–1965 or AAFC titles won from 1946–1949. Does not include folded NFL teams with zero "Appearances/Top 2 Finishes." In the "Seasons" column, bold years indicate NFL championships won.

List of various league/world championship game systems

Undefeated regular seasons and "perfect seasons" in professional football

(*) Since the NFL did not count tied games in league standings until 1972, these seasons were considered to be "perfect" at the time they finished; further, these teams had no incentive to avoid tied games in order to maintain a "perfect" season. Thus, the accuracy of calling these seasons "imperfect" is still disputed.

See also
 NFC Championship Game
 AFC Championship Game
 Players who have won the most NFL championships/Super Bowls

References